Tony Craig Tucker (born December 27, 1958) is an American former professional boxer who competed from 1980 to 1998. He won the IBF heavyweight title in 1987, and was the shortest-reigning world heavyweight champion at just 64 days. In an interview with Barry Tompkins, he referred to himself as the "invisible champion," due to the press and general public largely neglecting him. He is best known for giving Mike Tyson in his prime a relatively close fight, in which he, in the words of Larry Merchant, "rocked Tyson" in the first round. However, Tyson went on to win a unanimous decision. As an amateur, he won the 1979 United States national championships, the 1979 World Cup, and a gold medal at the 1979 Pan American Games, all in the light heavyweight division.

Amateur career
Tony Tucker became a boxer under influence of his father Bob Tucker, also a former amateur boxer, who became his trainer and manager, put all his wealth into the development of his son's boxing career. Tony fought out of Grand Rapids, Michigan, competing almost his entire amateur career in the light heavyweight division with his billed weight at the 1979 Pan American Games exactly matching the weight limit of the division (178 lbs).

Robert Surkein, the national boxing chairman for the Amateur Athletic Union, said of Tucker: “Believe me, he's better than Leon Spinks. Spinks couldn't hold this kid's gloves at a comparable stage.” Rollie Schwartz, past national chairman of the AAU Boxing Commission, said of Tucker prior to the Olympics, "Tucker is a combination boxer and puncher, much akin to Joe Louis. He comes right at you. I'd take him tomorrow over the two so-called light Heavyweight champs."

Highlights

United States National Championships, Biloxi, Mississippi, April 1978:
 1/8: Defeated Jerry Bennett by decision
 1/2: Lost to Charles Singleton by decision
U.S. National Sports Festival, Fort Carson, Colorado, July 1978:
 Finals: Lost to Elmer Martin by decision
 United States National Championships, Lake Charles, Louisiana, May 1979:
 1/2: Defeated Kelvin Anderson by decision
 Finals: Defeated Andre McCoy by decision
Pan Am Trials, Toledo, Ohio, May–June 1979:
 1/2: Defeated Elliott Chavis by decision
 Finals: Defeated Andre McCoy by decision

 Pan American Games, Roberto Clemente Coliseum, San Juan, Puerto Rico, July 1979:
 1/4: Defeated Sixto Soria (Cuba) by majority decision, 4–1 
 1/2: Defeated Patrick Fennel (Canada) RSC 3
 Finals: Defeated Dennis Jackson (Puerto Rico) by unanimous decision, 5–0 
 World Cup, Felt Forum, New York City, October 1979:
 1/4: Defeated Benny Pike (Australia) by unanimous decision, 5–0
 1/2: Defeated Kurt Seiler (West Germany) by unanimous decision, 5–0
 Finals: Defeated Albert Nikolyan (Soviet Union) by unanimous decision, 5–0

 International Duals
 February 1, 1979, Blackham Coliseum, Lafayette, Louisiana: Lost to Nikolay Yerofeyev (Soviet Union) by decision
 February 11, 1979, Estadio Latinamericano, Havana, Cuba: Lost to Hermenegildo Báez (Cuba) by decision
 February 24, 1979, Blackham Coliseum, Lafayette, Louisiana: Defeated Jacek Kucharczyk (Poland) by split decision, 2–1
 February 10, 1980, Charlotte Coliseum, Charlotte, North Carolina: Defeated Orestes Pedroso (Cuba)
 February 25, 1980, Blaisdell Arena, Honolulu, Hawaii: Defeated Ene Saipaia (Hawaii)
 March 1980, Schwerin, East Germany: Lost to Herbert Bauch (East Germany) by walkover
 March 1980, Schwerin, East Germany: Lost to Werner Kohnert (East Germany) by split decision, 1–2
 March 1980, Rostock, East Germany: Lost to Jürgen Fanghänel (East Germany) DQ 1

1980  Olympics
Since 1979 Tony Tucker anticipated participating in the Moscow Olympics. Tucker was an alternate for the United States Olympic Team for the 1980 Summer Olympics (Lee Roy Murphy qualified as the prime.) President Jimmy Carter ordered to boycott the Olympics, which led the U.S. Team to cancel its participation in the Olympics, instead it embarked on a series of exhibitions in Europe. On March 14, 1980, en route to Poland, their plane Polish Airlines IL-62 crashed near Warsaw, with the  U.S. boxing team aboard, consisting of 22 boxers, there were no survivors. Several people, including Tony Tucker, missed the flight and stayed in the United States due to various reasons,  in Tucker's case an injury sustained just prior to the accident. At that point Tucker became religious, believing that God spared his life for a purpose, in order for him to become the heavyweight champion of the world. Shortly thereafter Tucker turned pro.

Tucker finished his amateur career having 121 fights under his belt, with a record of 115–6.

Professional career
After turning pro in 1980, Tucker's early fights were often shown on NBC, as part of a collection known as "Tomorrow's Champions".

On the day of 14 March 1980 he was supposed to travel onboard LOT Flight 007 but he wasn't able to get onboard this plane which has saved his life.

Tucker's progress in the professional ranks was slow. He was injury prone, and he changed managers and trainers several times. Eventually his father Bob Tucker performed both roles. After enjoying a high-profile upon his professional debut, Tucker spent the majority of the 1980s boxing in off-TV bouts. In addition, he injured his knee in a bout against Danny Sutton, which caused him to miss a little over a year.

In June 1984, he scored a win by knocking out Eddie "The Animal" Lopez in 9 rounds on the undercard of the Tommy Hearns–Roberto Durán fight. It was the first time Lopez had ever been knocked down. In September 1984, he followed it up by outpointing Jimmy Young .

In September 1986, Tucker finally landed a big fight, against 242 lb James "Broad-Axe" Broad, for the USBA belt and a world title eliminator. Tucker won by unanimous decision.

IBF heavyweight champion
Home Box Office and Don King Productions orchestrated a heavyweight unification series for 1987, planning among its bouts a match between reigning IBF champion Michael Spinks and Tucker. Spinks refused to face Tucker, opting instead for a more lucrative bout with Gerry Cooney. The IBF withdrew its championship recognition of Spinks on February 19, mandating that Tucker (as the IBF's number 1-ranked contender) face its number 2 contender, Buster Douglas. Tucker won the bout, and the vacant IBF crown, via 10th-round technical knockout.

Tucker vs. Tyson

Tucker, as the winner of the IBF title, was obliged to immediately defend his title in a unification bout with WBA and WBC champion Mike Tyson, in what would be the tournament final, where Tucker was a 10-to-1 underdog. Before Tucker was managed by Emmanuel Steward, who received a negotiated percent of each payday. By that time for that same purpose a joint venture named Tucker Inc. was formed by his promoters Cedric Kushner (18% of total share), and Josephine Abercrombie with Jeff Levine (also 18%), partnering with Dennis Rappaport and Alan Kornberg (13%,) and lastly Emmanuel Steward (6%). His father Bob Tucker also secured a share in Tucker Inc. (12%)

Before the fight versus Tyson, Tucker had been on an eight-year-long winning streak, his last defeat was in 1979, while competing in amateurs.

Despite having a broken right hand, Tucker faced Tyson on August 1, 1987. Tyson defeated Tucker by unanimous decision to unify the three championship titles, in the process giving Tucker the distinction of having the shortest championship reign in the history of the Heavyweight division (64 days). According to the HBO Punch Statistics, Tucker landed 174 of 452 punches thrown, while Tyson landed 216 of 412, and in fact outjabbed Tucker, who had more than a 10-inch reach advantage (81" to 71").

HBO host and boxing great Sugar Ray Leonard said: "What Tucker displayed tonight was the fact that he is a non-conformist. He did what a lot of us thought he couldn't do, and that's why I respect him so much, because he boxed, he clinched, he was very strategic, very tactical, very intelligent fighter."

Coincidentally, eight years later this exact scenario would unfold to give Tucker another title shot, as the WBA would withdraw its championship recognition of George Foreman on March 4, 1995, after Foreman refused to face Tucker (who was its designated number 1 contender).  Unlike the 1987 scenario, this time Tucker would not earn a championship, as he would lose the match mandated by the WBA, against number 2-ranked contender Bruce Seldon.

Comeback

Tucker returned to boxing in 1989, and by 1992 was back in Don King's stable. He won the NABF belt with a 12-round split decision over the highly ranked Orlin Norris, and successfully defended it against future world champion Oliver McCall, winning another 12-round split decision. He finished 1992 with a 6th-round TKO of Frankie Swindell and set himself up for another world title shot.

By 1993, Tucker had run his record up to 48–1 and in May of that year he challenged Lennox Lewis for the WBC world heavyweight title. Lewis won a 12-round unanimous decision, knocking down Tucker twice (for the first 2 times in his pro career.) It was the first & second time in 34-year-old Tucker's pro career that he had been off his feet.

In 1995, George Foreman, who beat Michael Moorer in November 1994 to become the oldest heavyweight champion in history, refused to defend his WBA world heavyweight title against Tucker, choosing to fight German Axel Schulz. For the noncompliance with the rules the WBA officials stripped Foreman of the title. Tucker and Bruce Seldon fought for the vacant WBA belt in April 1995. Seldon won by TKO after 7 rounds when doctors stopped the fight due to Tucker's eye closing shut.

Tucker lost his shot at a rematch when later that year he was outpointed by a newly signed Don King heavyweight, British-Nigerian boxer Henry Akinwande, over ten rounds.

In 1996 he was outpointed by old rival Orlin Norris. He scored two low-key wins in California, and in 1997 traveled to the U.K. to challenge Herbie Hide for the vacant WBO  title. Tucker was dropped three times and knocked out in round 2.

In 1998 Tucker challenged John Ruiz for his NABF belt. Despite a big 6th round where he had Ruiz in trouble, Tucker was eventually stopped in the 11th round.

He came back in May to knock out journeyman Billy Wright in one round, but later had his license revoked due to medical concerns about Tucker's vision.

Professional boxing record

References

External links

1958 births
Living people
Heavyweight boxers
African-American boxers
American male boxers
Winners of the United States Championship for amateur boxers
Boxers from Michigan
Sportspeople from Grand Rapids, Michigan
International Boxing Federation champions
World heavyweight boxing champions
Boxers at the 1979 Pan American Games
Pan American Games gold medalists for the United States
Pan American Games medalists in boxing
Medalists at the 1979 Pan American Games
21st-century African-American people
20th-century African-American sportspeople